Macrobathra constrictella is a moth in the family Cosmopterigidae. It was described by Francis Walker in 1864. It is found in Australia.

References

Macrobathra
Moths described in 1864